The Union Watersphere, also known as the Union Water Tower, is a water tower topped with a sphere-shaped water tank  in Union, New Jersey, United States and characterized as the World's Tallest Water Sphere.

Adjacent to U.S. Route 22, New Jersey Route 82, and the Garden State Parkway, the iconic tower has been a landmark since its construction. The tower was originally commissioned the Elizabethtown Water Company and is now owned by American Water. Due to its proximity to an airport, at the request of the Federal Aviation Administration, a red stroboscopic beacon was constructed atop the tower in 2008, adding  of height. The pedestal is used as a telecommunications tower.

The tower is a grey-white, and in the past has been painted blue, with the name of the town in large letter across the sphere.  Its location at a major intersection of some of the state's busiest roads, and proximity to Newark Liberty International Airport, affords millions of people each year a view of the structure. A museum dedicated to the watersphere is located in Austin, Texas and is operated by a former Union resident. Another famous sphere, sometimes called the "world's largest light bulb" is located nearby at the Edison Memorial Tower.

Related and similar structures
However photographs of the Erwin water tower revealed the new tower to be a water spheroid.

Slightly taller than the Union Watersphere, it is technically a spheroid.

The name is taken from it being painted to resemble a globe of the world.
The Watertoren (or Water Towers) in Eindhoven, Netherlands contain three spherical tanks, each   in diameter and capable of holding   of water, on three   spires were completed in 1970.

See also
Weehawken Water Tower
Mechelen-Zuid Water Tower

References

External links 
Wikimapia Union-Watersphere
World's Tallest Watersphere
Lost in Jersey Union Watersphere

Water towers in New Jersey
Buildings and structures in Union County, New Jersey
Tourist attractions in Union County, New Jersey
Infrastructure completed in 1964
Towers completed in 1964
Roadside attractions in New Jersey
Union Township, Union County, New Jersey
1964 establishments in New Jersey